Hair Raiser is a steel floorless roller coaster at Ocean Park Hong Kong in Hong Kong Island, Hong Kong. Manufactured by Bolliger & Mabillard, the coaster opened on December 8, 2011, and is the twelfth floorless coaster to be built. The large smiling face entrance is loosely based on Luna Park Sydney in Australia.

Experience
After riders have boarded, the restraints are secure and the train is dispatched, the train takes about a half turn to the left before beginning to the climb the Chain lift hill. As the train reaches the top of the lift hill, the train goes through a pre-drop before making a sharp turn to the left towards the first drop. When the train reaches the bottom of the drop, it goes through a vertical loop followed by a slight turn to the left afterwards goes through the second out of four elements, a dive loop. After, the trains goes over a small airtime/bunny hill and goes through the zero-g roll. Immediately after, the train approaches the final inversion of the coaster, an immelmann loop. The train then enters a twisted airtime followed by another right turn before hitting the final brake run. After passing the brake run, the train makes a right turn going through another set of brakes before entering the station.

References

See also

 2011 in amusement parks

Roller coasters in Hong Kong
Floorless Coaster roller coasters manufactured by Bolliger & Mabillard